This is a list of countries and territories by border/area ratio. For each country or territory, the total length of the land borders and the total surface area are listed, as well as the ratio between these two parameters. A high border/area ratio means that the country or territory has a long border compared to its surface area. A border/area ratio of zero indicates that the country has no land borders.

Countries or territories that are connected only by bridges or other man-made causeways are not considered to have land borders.

Border/area ratio

Extremes
The countries with the highest border/area ratios are some of the smallest, non-island, nations of the world, such as Vatican City, Monaco and San Marino.
Many island nations, lack any land borders and thus have a border/area ratio of zero.

See also
How Long Is the Coast of Britain?
List of countries by area
List of countries and territories by maritime boundaries
List of countries that border only one other country
List of land borders by date of establishment
List of divided islands
List of island nations
List of political and geographic borders
List of sets of countries that border one another
List of bordering countries with greatest differences in GDP (PPP) per person
Separation barrier

Borders, land
Countries And Territories By Border/Area Ratio
Border area ratio